Gábor Vincze (born 7 September 1976) is a Hungarian retired football player. During his career he had a spell at Livingston in Scotland where he scored once against Rangers at Ibrox.

References

External links 
 Vincze Gábor at HLSZ.hu-n 
 
 
 

1976 births
Living people
Hungarian footballers
Hungary international footballers
Hungarian expatriate footballers
Ferencvárosi TC footballers
Debreceni VSC players
Győri ETO FC players
Livingston F.C. players
Ethnikos Achna FC players
Budapest Honvéd FC players
Expatriate footballers in Scotland
Expatriate footballers in Cyprus
Scottish Premier League players
Cypriot First Division players
Association football midfielders
Hungarian expatriate sportspeople in Scotland
People from Ózd
Sportspeople from Borsod-Abaúj-Zemplén County